John Talfryn Thomas (31 October 1922 – 4 November 1982) was a Welsh character actor, best known for supporting roles on television in the 1970s, including those of Private Cheeseman in Dad's Army (1973–1974) and Tom Price in Survivors (1975), while Thomas also appeared with Jon Pertwee in two Doctor Who serials.

Biography
John Talfryn Thomas was born in Swansea on 31 October 1922. He trained as an instrument mechanic but joined the local amateur dramatic society. During World War II, he joined the Royal Air Force (RAF), and was a rear gunner on a Lancaster bomber, flying on multiple raids into Germany. After surviving a crash in which all the other crew members were killed, he took up acting partly as therapy for the trauma, before training as an actor in the London Academy of Music and Dramatic Art (LAMDA).

For some time Thomas acted in provincial theatres. In the late 1950s, he began making television appearances, and in the 1960s appeared in two episodes of The Avengers - "A Surfeit of H2O" (1965) and "Look Stop Me" (1968) alongside stars Patrick Macnee, Diana Rigg and Linda Thorson - as well as appearing with Roger Moore in The Saint (1968), an uncredited rôle in The Champions in the episode "The Body Snatchers" (1969), and in The Persuaders! (as The Poacher in the episode "A Home Of One's Own", 1971). In 1973, Thomas appeared in the Seven of One episode "I'll Fly You for a Quid", appearing alongside Ronnie Barker in a community of Welsh gamblers. Thomas also appeared with Jon Pertwee in the Doctor Who serials, Spearhead from Space (1970) and The Green Death (1973), and in the Worzel Gummidge episode "The Scarecrow Wedding" (1980). Thomas excelled at playing quirky and sometimes seedy Welshmen. His distinctive appearance was enhanced by his protruding front teeth, which earned him the nickname 'Talf The Teef'. Thomas is perhaps best remembered for his role as Mr. Cheeseman in one series of the television comedy Dad's Army (1973-1974).

In 1975, Thomas appeared as Tom Price in seven episodes of the first series of the BBC TV series, Survivors, acting alongside main stars Carolyn Seymour, Ian McCulloch and Lucy Fleming, before the character of Tom was killed off in the tenth episode of the first series. In 1979, Thomas appeared on The Ken Dodd Laughter Show with Rita Webb and Pat Ashton (and he was a regular on Ken Dodd's BBC radio comedy show).

Talfryn Thomas' few films included Sky West and Crooked (1965) starring Hayley Mills, and Andrew Sinclair's adaptation of Dylan Thomas's Under Milk Wood (1972), with Richard Burton, Elizabeth Taylor and Peter O'Toole. Like Burton, Talfryn Thomas had been in the BBC radio play. He was also seen in Come Play with Me (1977) and the cult film, Sir Henry at Rawlinson End (1980) from Vivian Stanshall.

Thomas died of a heart attack on 4 November 1982, four days after his 60th birthday.

Selected television roles

Films
Sky West and Crooked (1966) - Brand
Under Milk Wood (1972) - Mr. Pugh
The Battle of Billy's Pond (1976) - Mr. Pugh
Come Play with Me (1977) - Nosegay
Sir Henry at Rawlinson End (1980) - Teddy Tidy

References

External links

Article about Talfryn Thomas

1922 births
1982 deaths
Welsh male television actors
Male actors from Swansea
20th-century Welsh male actors
Royal Air Force personnel of World War II
Royal Air Force airmen